Wladimir van Wilgenburg is a Dutch journalist and author writing predominantly about Kurdistan. He has written for Al-Monitor, Kurdistan 24, Al-Jazeera, and Foreign Policy, amongst others. He lives in Erbil, Iraqi Kurdistan.

Biography 
His interest for the Kurds began early in secondary school, as he wrote a thesis comparing Armenians and Kurds. Further on he wrote for the Kurdish focused blogs Azady.nl and Halwest.nl. In 2009, he began an internship at Rudaw in Iraqi Kurdistan. Van Wilgenburg received a Master of Arts in conflict studies from the University in Utrecht in 2011 and another one in Kurdish studies from Exeter University in 2013. 

He is also a researcher for the Jamestown Foundation and his articles are published by the Atlantic Council.  He lives in Erbil, Iraqi Kurdistan. He co-authored the book The Kurds of Northern Syria, together with Harriet Allsop, which was published by I.B. Tauris in August 2019.

Controversies 
He was prevented from entering Turkey twice, once in 2007 and an other time in 2014. In 2014 he had a connecting flight at the Istanbul Airport on his way to the Sulaymaniyah Forum hosted in the American University, Iraqi Kurdistan.

References 

Dutch journalists
21st-century male writers
Year of birth missing (living people)
Living people